The 2014 Hungary GP2 Series round was a pair of motor races held on July 26 and 27, 2014 at the Hungaroring in Mogyoród, Pest, Hungary as part of the GP2 Series. It is the sixth round of the 2014 season. The race weekend supported the 2014 Hungarian Grand Prix.

Report

Qualifying
Going into the qualifying session, Felipe Nasr was placed in second place in the overall championship. His target was of course to beat his championship rival Jolyon Palmer, but also to get that pole position and four crucial points that could make or break a championship title. In the end, Nasr qualified on pole position ahead of Tom Dillmann, with Palmer down in sixth place.

Classification

Qualifying

Notes:
 — Johnny Cecotto Jr. was given a three-place grid penalty after being judged to have caused a collision with Jolyon Palmer during Saturday's practise session.

Feature race

Notes:
 —Both Raffaele Marciello and Stefano Coletti received a 20-second time penalty post-race. Marciello was penalised for overtaking Stoffel Vandoorne under neutralised safety car conditions, while Coletti was penalised for forcing Julián Leal off the track at turn 12, causing Leal to retire. They finished second and sixth respectively prior to the penalties.

See also 
 2014 Hungarian Grand Prix
 2014 Hungaroring GP3 Series round

References

External links
 

Hungaroring
GP2